Beulah "Cora Combs" Szostecki (March 17, 1927 – June 21, 2015), better known by her ring name as Cora Combs, was an American professional wrestler. She was the last survivor of the Billy Wolfe troupe. She mainly wrestled in Indianapolis.

Professional wrestling career
Combs was born in 1923 in Hazard, Kentucky. Before she was a professional wrestler, Combs was a country music singer. In 1949, she attended a pro wrestling show headlined by Mildred Burke, then the biggest star in women's pro wrestling. Nick Gulas presented her to pro wrestler Billy Wolfe, who trained her.

Combs also wrestled her own daughter, Debbie Combs, under a mask as Lady Satan.

In 2007, Combs was inducted in the Pro Wrestling Hall of Fame.

Personal life and death

Combs had a daughter, Debbie Combs, who also was a professional wrestler.

Combs died on June 21, 2015 in Nashville at the age of 88. She had pneumonia in the week preceding her death.

Championships and accomplishments

 National Wrestling Alliance
 NWA United States Women's Championship (4 times)
 NWA Southern Women's Championship (Florida version) (2 times)
 Professional Wrestling Hall of Fame
 Class of 2007
 WWE
 WWE Hall of Fame (Class of 2018)

See also
 List of oldest surviving professional wrestlers

References

External links
 
 
Official page at DDT Digest

1927 births
2015 deaths
American female professional wrestlers
Sportswomen from Kentucky
People associated with physical culture
People from Hazard, Kentucky
WWE Hall of Fame Legacy inductees
Professional Wrestling Hall of Fame and Museum
Stampede Wrestling alumni
21st-century American women
Deaths from pneumonia in Tennessee
20th-century professional wrestlers